Scrubs Magazine is a lifestyle magazine and website for nurses, which premiered November 15, 2009. The quarterly magazine, which covers a range of lifestyle topics including beauty, money, style, health, and wellness, is audited by Business Publications Audit (BPA) Worldwide. Scrubs magazine has a paid circulation of 371,082 for the period ending December 31, 2011. It is distributed to select nursing students, VIP nursing school administrators, key nursing associations, and over 1,500 nursing apparel stores nationwide.

The Scrubs website features breaking news in the medical field, industry news, and conversations with nurse influencers. It has an average monthly traffic of 2 million. Its social channels include: Funny Nurses, Scrubs Magazine, 
Men in Nursing, Soy Enfermer, Student Nurses and has an average follower base of 5 million users.

Concept
Strategic Partners, Inc. (SPI) – a nursing apparel and footwear company in the United States and manufacturer/distributor of scrubs – is the Publisher. The concept for Scrubs was created by Michael Singer of SPI now Careismatic Brands.

References

External links
 
 Miami Herald: http://www.miamiherald.com/living/health/story/1358763.html
 MediaPost: http://www.mediapost.com/publications/?fa=Articles.showArticle&art_aid=120544
 Washington Post: https://www.washingtonpost.com/wp-dyn/content/article/2009/11/20/AR2009112003534.html
 Nursing Times: https://www.nursingtimes.net/archive/lifestyle-magazine-for-nurses-launches-22-11-2009/
 National Public Radio: http://marketplace.publicradio.org/display/web/2009/11/13/am-nurses-mag/
 LA Observed: http://www.laobserved.com/archive/2009/11/looking_at_scrubs_magazin.php
 ANA Smart Brief: http://alquemie.smartbrief.com/alquemie/servlet/encodeServlet?issueid=65DF0B70-5AAC-4B09-AFCF-ABD7E499E67F&lmcid=archives
 LA Times: http://latimesblogs.latimes.com/booster_shots/2009/11/nurses-work-long-hours-sometimes-for-little-pay-and-are-often-under-appreciated-for-their-caregiving-work-but-some-recogni.html
 Mediabistro: http://www.mediabistro.com/fishbowlny/magazines/scrubs_enters_niche_magazine_market_142079.asp
 Folio: http://www.foliomag.com/2009/apparel-manufacturing-launch-lifestyle-magazine-nurses
 Press Release, November 2009: http://scrubsmag.com/scrubs-magazine-premieres-november-3-2009-press-release/

Lifestyle magazines published in the United States
Magazines established in 2009
Magazines published in California